Tellisford Mill is a  installed capacity micro hydro run-of-the-river power station on the site of a former watermill in the village of Tellisford in the Mendip district of Somerset, England.

The turbine replaced a  Francis turbine built in 1895.

Tellisford Mill is also home to a photographic studio.

References

External links

 Gants Mill – a similar installation
 Tellisford Mill at Somerset Rivers

Energy infrastructure completed in 1895
Energy infrastructure completed in 2007
Watermills in Somerset
Run-of-the-river power stations
Frome
Buildings and structures in Mendip District
Mill museums in England
Hydroelectric power stations in England